Monique Piétri (20 April 1945 – 25 June 1993) was a French swimmer. She competed in the women's 100 metre freestyle at the 1964 Summer Olympics.

References

External links
 

1945 births
1993 deaths
Olympic swimmers of France
Swimmers at the 1964 Summer Olympics
Place of birth missing
French female freestyle swimmers